The Aerospace Logistics Technology Engineering Company (ALTEC) is an Italian aerospace company owned by the Italian Space Agency and Thales Alenia Space. It was founded in 2001 by Alenia Spazio and Consorzio Icarus, and is based in Turin. It will serve as the Control Centre for the two ExoMars missions to Mars.

References

External links
ALTEC home page

Aerospace companies
Thales Group joint ventures
European Space Agency
Science and technology in Italy
ExoMars